Abdul Haq Choudhury (19221994) was a Bangladeshi writer. He was awarded Ekushey Padak in 2011 by the Government of Bangladesh.

Education and career
Choudhury studied in Raozan High School. In 1942 he joined Noajispur Primary School, founded by his father, as a teacher. He collected relics of Nuxrat Shah, Isa Khan, Arakan Fort from Chittagong, Sylhet, Arakan and Tripura.

Bibliography
Choudhury wrote eleven books.

 Chattagramer Itihas Prasanga (1976)
 Chattagramer Samaj O Sangskrtir Ruprekha (1988)
 Sylheter Itihas Prasanga (1981)
 Chattagram-Arakan (1989)
 Prachin Arakan Rohinga Hindu 0 Barua Bauddha Adibasi (1994)
 Chattagramer Charitabhidhan

Awards
 Natun Chandra Singh Memorial Medal (1984) 
 Lekhika Sangha Medal (1987)
 Ekushey Padak (2011)

References

1922 births
1994 deaths
20th-century Bangladeshi historians
Recipients of the Ekushey Padak